Executive is a novel by Piers Anthony published in 1985.

Plot summary
Executive is a novel in which Hope Hubris is the liberal Tyrant of Jupiter.

Reception
Dave Langford reviewed Executive for White Dwarf #82, and stated that "The allegory can get wearying: this is presumably why the book is pepped up with massive doses of the weird exercise (combined arm-wrestling, origami and dialectical analysis) which is the author's version of sex."

Reviews
Review by Michael R. Collings (1986) in Fantasy Review, January 1986

References

1985 American novels
1985 science fiction novels
Avon (publisher) books